is a railway station located in Kitakyūshū, Fukuoka.

Lines 

Chikuhō Electric Railroad
Chikuhō Electric Railroad Line

Platforms

Adjacent stations

Surrounding area
 Kasugadai kominkan

Railway stations in Fukuoka Prefecture
Railway stations in Japan opened in 1965